Alfredo Angulo López (born August 11, 1982) is a Mexican professional boxer who held the WBO interim light middleweight title from 2009 to 2010. As an amateur he represented Mexico at the 2004 Olympics, reaching the first round of the middleweight bracket. Nicknamed "El Perro" ("The Dog"), Angulo was a highly regarded light middleweight prospect in the late 2000s and early 2010s, and is particularly known for his relentless pressure fighting style and formidable punching power.

Amateur career
He qualified for the Olympic Games by ending up in second place at the 1st AIBA American 2004 Olympic Qualifying Tournament in Tijuana, Mexico.
At the Olympics Angulo lost to Andy Lee, by a score of 38:23. Angulo also has an amateur win over former WBO Welterweight champion Timothy Bradley. Angulo ended his amateur career with a record of 80-15.

Professional career

Alfredo Angulo is an all-action fighter, who turned professional in Arizona. The Mexican was considered by many boxing analysts to be the next Light Middleweight World Champion.
 On May 17, 2008, he defeated Richard Gutierrez inside of five rounds to take his professional record to 13 wins, 10 by way of knockout. On October 4, 2008, Angulo defeated Ukraine's Andrey Tsurkan (26-3, 17 KO). Angulo, from the beginning of the round was relentless, averaging over 100 punches per round. He stopped Tsurkan in the 11th round when referee Tony Krebs stepped in. Angulo was scheduled to fight former champion Ricardo Mayorga on February 14, 2009. However, Mayorga pulled out ten days before the fight after demanding a larger purse. Angulo fought former NABO light Welterweight champion Cosme Rivera as a replacement and defeated him by fifth-round technical knockout.

WBO interim junior middleweight champion 
In November 2009 Angulo defeated an undefeated Harry Joe Yorgey to claim the interim WBO light middleweight title.

Although Angulo finished off Yorgey in the third round, he scored a knockdown in the second round while landing 58 of 108 punches (according to CompuBox). A huge right hand did the initial damage as he hurt Yorgey against the ropes. But Angulo did not let him off the hook and continued to pound away for the knockout win.

First title defense 
Angulo knocked out Joel Julio in the 11th round of their bout on April 24, 2010.
Angulo stopped Joel Julio with a right cross midway through the 11th round to retain the WBO interim 154-pound title. Angulo earned his third straight KO victory after his only defeat against Kermit Cintron last May. Angulo was slightly more aggressive than the counterpunching Julio, consistently attacking and peppering the Colombian with combinations, including a nasty series of blows in the eighth round.

Angulo vs. Alcine 
On July 17, 2010, Angulo scored a first round stoppage over former WBA Super Welterweight Champion Joachim "Ti-Joa" Alcine (32-1, 19 KOs) of Montreal. Angulo won the vacant WBC Continental Americas Light Middleweight Title.

Return 
On August 20, 2011 Angulo made quick work of Joseph Gomez for his first fight in 13 months. He stopped the New Mexico-based journeyman in the first round with a straight right-left hook to the midsection followed by a cuffing right cross to the back of the head. Angulo's visa problems, prevented him from fighting in the U.S., made the beef with Shaw a moot point.

Angulo vs. Mora 
On April 7, 2018, Angulo lost to Sergio Mora via split-decision. Two of the judges scored it 78-74 for Mora, while the third had Angulo winning the fight, 75-77.

Angulo vs. Bravo 
On April 20, 2019, Angulo fought Evert Bravo. Angulo won the fight via a second round knockout.

Angulo vs. Quillin 
On September 21, 2019, Angulo faced Peter Quillin. Quillin was ranked #4 by the IBF and #14 by the WBC at super middleweight. Despite being the underdog in the fight, Angulo boxed well and managed to hurt Quillin on multiple occasions. This performance earned Angulo the split-decision victory, winning on two of the scorecards, 97-93 and 96-94, while the third judge had Quillin winning the fight, 96-94.

Professional boxing record

Pay-per-view bouts

References

External links

Get 2 Know Alfred Angulo at boxinginsider.com
Alfredo Angulo - Profile, News Archive & Current Rankings at Box.Live

Boxers from Baja California
Olympic boxers of Mexico
Sportspeople from Mexicali
Middleweight boxers
Light-middleweight boxers
Boxers at the 2004 Summer Olympics
Boxers at the 2003 Pan American Games
1982 births
Living people
Mexican male boxers
Pan American Games bronze medalists for Mexico
Pan American Games medalists in boxing
Central American and Caribbean Games bronze medalists for Mexico
Competitors at the 2002 Central American and Caribbean Games
Central American and Caribbean Games medalists in boxing
Medalists at the 2003 Pan American Games